Events from the year 1952 in Denmark.

Incumbents
 Monarch – Frederick IX
 Prime minister – Erik Eriksen

Events

Sports

Badminton
 711 March  All England Badminton Championships
 Tonny Ahm wins gold in Women's Single at the All England Badminton Championships.
 Tonny Ahm and Aase Schiøtt Jacobsen wins gold in Women's Double
 Poul Holm and Tonny Ahm win gold in Mixed Fouble

Births
 29 February – Orla Østerby, politician
 3 April – Orla Hav, politician
 27 April – Ole Svendsen, welterweight boxer
 11 June – Anne Birgitte Lundholt, politician and businessperson
 19 June – Poul Nesgaard, television personality, director of the National Film School of Denmark
 15 December – Allan Simonsen, footballer, 1977 European Footballer of the Year
 23 December – Hans Abrahamsen, composer

Deaths
 18 April – Agnes Smidt, painter and cultural activist (born 1874)
 22 May – Liva Weel, actress (born 1897)
 4 June – Rasmus Harboe, sculptor (born 1868)
 10 July – Rued Langgaard, composer and organist (born 1893)
 7 November – Christian Nielsen, sailor, silver medallist at the 1924 Summer Olympics (born 1873)

Date unknown
 August Hesselbo, pharmaceutical botanist and bryologist (born 1874)

References

 
Denmark
Years of the 20th century in Denmark
1950s in Denmark
1952 in Europe